iParty with Victorious is a 2011 television movie that acts as a crossover of the television series iCarly and Victorious. It premiered on Nickelodeon June 11, 2011.

The movie was watched by 7.3 million viewers. It also marked Kenan Thompson's brief return to Nickelodeon. "iParty with Victorious" was released on DVD on August 30, 2011 on the third season DVD of iCarly and on the second volume of the Victorious first season DVD.

Plot
Carly Shay (Miranda Cosgrove) (iCarly) is dating a boy named Steven Carson (Cameron Deane Stewart), who divides his time between his divorced parents in Seattle and Los Angeles. Every other month, Steven goes off to Los Angeles, where he is also dating Tori Vega (Victoria Justice) (Victorious), who attends Hollywood Arts, a high school for the performing arts. Robbie Shapiro (Matt Bennett), a socially awkward friend of Tori's, posts a picture of Steven and Tori online, which Carly and her friend Sam Puckett (Jennette McCurdy) stumble upon. Carly denies that Steven is cheating on her, but Sam seeks to prove otherwise.

Carly, her brother Spencer (Jerry Trainor), Sam, and their friends Freddie Benson (Nathan Kress) and Gibby Gibson (Noah Munck) travel to Los Angeles. They visit Spencer's ex-girlfriend, Monie (Jen Lilley), who happens to be a skilled make-up artist, and receive disguise makeovers to avoid being noticed from iCarly by others. They then head off to Kenan Thompson's house, where Andre Harris (Leon Thomas III), another friend of Tori's, is hosting a party that they suspect Steven and Tori are attending; Rex, Robbie's ventriloquist dummy, has tweeted about the party, resulting in hundreds of people attending, much to the dismay of Andre, who had only wanted a small party. The iCarly gang enter Kenan's house during the party and split up to search for Steven. Spencer discovers that the house includes a jacuzzi and relaxes in it, leading to him meeting Tori's teacher Sikowitz (Eric Lange) and her friends Beck Oliver (Avan Jogia) and Jade West (Elizabeth Gillies). Sinjin Van Cleef (Michael Eric Reid), another student at Hollywood Arts, falls into the jacuzzi when a surfing machine malfunctions. Meanwhile, Carly catches Steven and watches him kiss Tori, after which she admits that Sam was correct about Steven cheating on her.

The iCarly members remove their disguises, and Tori walks in and immediately recognizes them from iCarly. Carly and her friends explain the situation to Tori, and together they come up with a plan to humiliate Steven. They lure Steven into a closet where he thinks he will make out with Tori for a "100th day anniversary". Instead, when Steven enters the closet, he finds himself on an iCarly webcast with Carly, Sam, Kenan, and Tori, who reveal to iCarlys one million audience members that Steven has been dating Carly and Tori at the same time before they both dump him. Steven becomes embarrassed and leaves. Sometime later, Sam defeats Rex in a rap battle. The iCarly gang then join Tori and her friends in karaoke, where they end the special by singing "Leave It All to Shine", a mash-up of the iCarly and Victorious theme songs.

Cast

iCarly cast
 Miranda Cosgrove as Carly Shay – Carly hosts her own eponymous web show titled iCarly and has become an internet sensation. She is Spencer’s younger sister. She is also friends with Sam, Freddie, and Gibby. She is the girlfriend of Steven Carson. When in disguise, she is known as Patty Schwab.
 Jennette McCurdy as Sam Puckett – Carly's delinquent sidekick, troublemaking best friend, and co-host for iCarly. When in disguise, she is known as Regina Goodbody.
 Nathan Kress as Freddie Benson – iCarlys technical producer and director. He is also the techy, geeky neighbor of Carly and Spencer. When in disguise, he is known as Chess Masterson.
 Jerry Trainor as Spencer Shay – Carly's older brother, and a skilled artist. He is also Carly's legal guardian.
 Noah Munck as Gibby Gibson – One of the iCarly gang's friends, and the odd background star of the web show. When in disguise, he is known as Roger Mole.
 David St. James as Mr. Howard – A strict math teacher at Carly's school, Ridgeway Junior High, who hates all his students.
 Mary Scheer as Marissa Benson – Freddie's stereotypically overprotective mother.
BooG!e as The Panda – A mysterious person dressed in a panda costume that goes around the party whacking people with a tennis racket.

Victorious cast
Victoria Justice as Tori Vega – A talented teenager who is a student at Hollywood Arts, an elite performing arts high school. She is also the other girlfriend of Steven Carson, and Trina's younger sister. She is shown to be an iCarly fan in the beginning of the movie.
Leon Thomas III as Andre Harris – Tori's best friend, an aspiring songwriter and the mentor at Hollywood Arts. He is also the host of the big party at Kenan Thompson's house.
Matt Bennett as Robbie Shapiro – One of Tori’s friends, and a nerdy student at Hollywood Arts. He is almost always seen with his "best friend" Rex, who is really a ventriloquist's dummy that he carries around everywhere. He takes the picture of Tori and Steven that prompts the iCarly team to drive to L.A. and seek Steven. Jake Farrow is uncredited as the voice of Rex Powers, Robbie's best friend and alter ego whom everyone treats as real.
Elizabeth Gillies as Jade West – Tori's mean, rude frenemy, who always causes her trouble. She is Beck's girlfriend and the occasional antagonist of Victorious. 
Ariana Grande as Cat Valentine – Another one of Tori's eccentric friends who is sweet, cheerful, and also quite dimwitted. In this crossover, Cat has difficulty speaking due to a vocal cord infection and uses a voice simulator called Speechy King. Before the end, however, she takes it off after Cat's vocal cords had been fixed and finally sings it out.
Avan Jogia as Beck Oliver – Another one of Tori's friends, and an actor at Hollywood Arts. He is dating Jade as her boyfriend.
Daniella Monet as Trina Vega – Tori's diva-like older sister, who also attends Hollywood Arts.
Eric Lange as Mr. Sikowitz – A popular hippie-like drama teacher at Hollywood Arts.
Lane Napper as Lane Alexander – The guidance counselor for Hollywood Arts.
Michael Eric Reid as Sinjin Van Cleef – A freaky student at Hollywood Arts.
Marilyn Harris as Mrs. Harris – Andre's grandmother.

Guest stars
Kenan Thompson as himself
Cameron Deane Stewart as Steven Carson – He is dating both Carly and Tori as their boyfriend, a fact that neither of them are aware of.
 Justin Castor as Mark – A kid who recognizes Gibby and is punched before he can reveal him.
Jen Lilley as Monie – Spencer's ex-girlfriend who helps disguise Carly, Sam, Freddie, and Gibby.
 Kwame Patterson as DJ Mustang – The DJ at Andre's big party at Kenan Thompson's house.
 Cierra Russell as Mabel – One of the kids who Trina babysits. Trina, forgetting Mabel's name, calls her Vanessa.
 Walt Schoen as Wilson – Another one of the kids who Trina babysits.

Production
iParty with Victorious was produced as episodes 311–313 of iCarly. It does not count as a Victorious episode.

Victoria Justice appears in iCarly for the second time for "iParty with Victorious", following her appearance as Shelby Marx in the special "iFight Shelby Marx" (Sam also comments on Tori Vega's resemblance to Shelby Marx on the computer). Leon Thomas III, Daniella Monet, and Lane Napper also make return appearances, having appeared in the episodes "iCarly Saves TV", "iPsycho", and "iWas a Pageant Girl" respectively.

The crossover special also marks Kenan Thompson's brief return to Nickelodeon. Thompson previously starred in the Nickelodeon shows All That and Kenan & Kel and had done voice work on The Mighty B!. Victoria Justice is credited with the iCarly cast in the opening sequence while the rest of the Victorious cast are credited during the in-show credits. Kenan Thompson is mentioned during the ending credits.

While in Kenan Thompson's house, "The Joke Is On You" by Niki Watkins, "Give It Up" by Elizabeth Gillies and Ariana Grande, performed in the Victorious episode "Freak the Freak Out", and "Number One (My World)" by fictional Ginger Fox was played.

Music
 "Leave It All to Me"
 "Make It Shine"
 "Number One"
 "Leave It All to Shine"

Subsequent crossovers
This is the first of four crossovers between both iCarly and Victorious. The second and third crossovers occur during each show's April Fools' Day specials, both of which debuted on March 24, 2012. At one point in the Victorious April Fools' special, "April Fools Blank", Tori is seen coming out of the elevator and into the living room of Carly's apartment, where Spencer is sitting on the couch. Meanwhile, in the iCarly episode "iApril Fools", Carly, Sam, Freddie, and Spencer appear in Tori's living room sitting next to Robbie, who is actually a transformed version of Gibby. Sam also sings a line from "Make it Shine". The Nickelodeon series Sam & Cat (a crossover/spin-off and sequel of both shows) acts as the permanent fourth crossover, with Sam and Cat living as roommates and starting a babysitting service to fund their adventures. Freddie, Robbie, and Jade make special return appearances in the Sam & Cat hour-long special "#TheKillerTunaJump", and Gibby, Nevel and Nora made a special appearance in the Sam & Cat 45-minute special "#SuperPsycho".

This is also the first of three times that Jennette McCurdy has been involved with Victorious; the second was when McCurdy guest starred as "Crazy Ponnie" in the Victorious episode of the same name, and the third time was reprising her role of Sam on Sam & Cat. On iCarly, Victoria Justice appeared as fighter Shelby Marx in the episode "iFight Shelby Marx", Leon Thomas III as Harper in "iCarly Saves TV", and Daniella Monet as a party goer at Nora Dershlit's house in "iPsycho".

Reception
"iParty with Victorious" received mainly positive reviews from critics. Verne Gay of Newsday gave a positive review, suggesting "iParty with Victorious" may be the biggest event of the Summer 2011 and noting the scene depicting a guy in a panda costume chasing Kenan Thompson was hilarious. Carl Cortez of Assignment X praised the episode but also gave a slightly more critical review. He believes "the mechanism for verifying Carly’s boyfriend is cheating is a bit of a stretch". He reacted positively to how the times spent with the characters of iCarly and Victorious are evenly distributed. Overall, he finds the episode to be "enjoyable nonetheless" and gives it a grade of B−. This crossover aired during the 2011 NBA Finals and the 2011 Stanley Cup Finals.

The movie did well in the ratings, drawing 7.3 million viewers, and was the top-rated cable program for the week of June 6–12, 2011.

See also
 List of Nickelodeon original films

References

External links

 
 

2011 American television episodes
Crossover television
American crossover films
ICarly
Television episodes set in Los Angeles
Victorious
Films directed by Steve Hoefer